Sivasagar (Pron:  or ) ("the sea of Shiva"), is a city in and headquarters of the Sivasagar district, Assam. Sivasagar is situated about 360 kilometers (224 mi) northeast of Guwahati. It is well known for its Ahom palaces and monuments. Sivasagar is an important centre for tea and oil industries today.
Sivasagar is a part of Jorhat (Lok Sabha constituency). Akhil Gogoi is the current MLA of Sibsagar (Vidhan Sabha constituency).

History 
Sivasagar, formerly known as Rangpur, was the capital of the Ahom Kingdom from 1699 to 1788. The Ahoms ruled Assam for six centuries until their kingdom fell to the Burmese in 1819 and their ruling class was all but wiped out.

During the reign Gaurinath Singha a battle was fought  against the Moamariya rebels on the vicinity of the Sivasagar tank.

The province was conquered by the British in 1825 and was completely annexed in 1826. For administrative purposes, it was divided into three sub-divisions.

Name
It is said that the original name of Sivasagar was - 'Kalansupar' after the name of 'Kalansu Gohain' who resided in a village that originally existed in the place where currently the Sivasagar tank is located.  In the year 1733, the Ahom queen Ambika devi dug a tank at the ahom capital Rangpur, covering a area of 257 acre. The place came to be known as Sivpore (Sivpur) being associated with the great Siva temple (Siva Dol) built on the bank of this tank. Then with the passage-of time, the name Sibsagar was formed.

Geography 
It has an average elevation of 86.6 meters above sea level.

Demographics 
An official Census 2011 detail of Sivasagar
In 2011, Sivasagar had a population of 50,781 of which males and females were 26,925 and 23,856 respectively. In the 2001 census, Sivasagar had a population of 53,854. In the 2001 census, this figure for Sivasagar District was at 0.17 percent of Assam's population.

There was a change of 5.7 percent in the population compared to the population as per 2001. In the previous census of India 2001, Sivasagar recorded an increase of 44.2 percent to its population compared to 1991. 
The average literacy rate of Sivasagar in 2011 was 80.41 compared to 74.47 of 2001. If things are looked out at gender wise, male and female literacy were 85.84 and 74.71 respectively. For 2001 census, same figures stood at 81.53 and 66.81 in Sivasagar District. Total literate in Sivasagar District was 813,505 of which male and female were 444,767 and 368,738 respectively.

Population History
<div style="width:100%;">

District Court 
After the declaration of a separate Civil District of Sivasagar in the year 1984, the District Judiciary was set up in the year 1985, while the District Judge of erstwhile amalgamated Sivasagar District was Late Purna Ch. Saikia the then District Judge of Sivasagar Headquarter at Jorhat, who took out all the initiatives to inaugurate the District Judiciary from Jorhat and the first District & Sessions Judge at Sivasagar was Sri G.S. Basumatari, which was inaugurated by the Hon’ble Chief Justice Sri K.Lahiri on 16th day of April,1985. 
The C.J.M. court was opened at Sivasagar on 1983.  The court of Sub-Divisional Judicial Magistrate, Charaideo, Sonari was established on 1984. The Civil Judge & Asstt. Sessions Judge, Sivasagar was opened in the year, 1987. The Addl. District & Sessions Judge (F.T.C) was functioning from the year 2001. The circuit court of the Addl. District & Sessions Judge, Charaideo, Sonari was established on the 15th day of December, 2003.The Sub-Divisional Judicial Magistrate Court(M), Nazira was functioning 24 July 2014.As per order of the Hon'ble Gauhati High Court, the new Addl. District and Sessions Judge, Charaideo, Sonari is functioning on the date of 09-02-2018. On the date of 27-02-2021, Charaideo judicial courts separated from Sivasagar district. There are twelve Judicial Courts now in Sivasagar District and are functioning very smoothly.

Transport

Air 
Jorhat Airport located at Jorhat, 75 km away from Sivasagar. Another option for getting here is via Dibrugarh Airport, located at a distance of 95 km from the city.

Rail 
Sibsagar Town railway station serves the town. The nearest railway junction on the Tinsukia-Guwahati sector of the Northeast Frontier Railways is Simaluguri Junction, 16 kilometers (9.9 mi) from Sivasagar. Buses ply regularly from Simaluguri towards Sivasagar. It is approximately a half-hour bus ride from Simaluguri town.

Road 
Sivasagar is well connected by road with the rest of the state. State-run buses connect it to Guwahati, Dibrugarh, and Jorhat from the Assam State Transport Corporation's (ASTC) bus station in Sivasagar. Private buses are also available. Taxis are also available for hire. Auto-rickshaws and other modes of transport are available in and around the town. Cheaper modes of transport, like Tata Magic and Tempos, are available through Nazira, Mechagarh and Joysagar to Sivasagar.

Healthare and education

Universities 
Assam Rajiv Gandhi University of Cooperative Management

Petroleum institute 
Rajiv Gandhi Institute of Petroleum Technology

Colleges 
Sibsagar College
Sibsagar Girls' College
Sibsagar Commerce College

Healthcare
Siukafa Multispeciality Hospital, Pragati Hospital and research centre, Aditya Diagnostic and Hospital, Sampriti Hospital, East Point and Research centre, Sivasagar Civil Hospital and Sarma Nursing home.

Politics 
Sibsagar is a part of Jorhat (Lok Sabha constituency). Akhil Gogoi of RD is the incumbent MLA from Sivasagar assembly constituency.

Notable people 
Bhaskar Jyoti Mahanta, DGP of Assam police
Bhogeswar Baruah, former athlete and coach
Hiteswar Saikia, politician
Pranab Kumar Gogoi, politician
Manas Robin, musician
Akhil Gogoi, MLA Sivasagar Constituency
Devoleena Bhattacharjee, Indian TV actress 
Amrita Gogoi, Assamese actress

References

External links 

http://sivasagar.nic.in

 
Sivasagar district